Katherine Mary Knight (born 24 October 1955) is an Australian murderer and the first woman in the country's history to be sentenced to life imprisonment without parole. She was convicted for the murder of her partner, John Charles Thomas Price, in February 2000, and is currently imprisoned at the Silverwater Women's Correctional Centre in New South Wales. Knight stabbed Price to death, skinned him, and then put his skin on a meat hook. She then cooked his head and parts of his body with the intention of feeding them to Price's children but was stopped by police.

Early life and family
Katherine Knight was born and raised in an unconventional and dysfunctional family environment. Her mother, Barbara Roughan (née Thorley), had been married to Jack Roughan and lived with him in the small town of Aberdeen in New South Wales' Hunter Valley. They had four sons before Barbara began an adulterous relationship with Ken Knight, a friend and co-worker of her then-husband.

Local backlash forced Barbara and Ken to move to Moree. None of her sons went with her; the two eldest boys continued to reside with their father and the two younger sons were sent to be raised by an aunt in Sydney. Barbara had four additional children with Ken, including twin girls born in 1955 in Tenterfield; Katherine Knight was one of these twin daughters. In 1959, when Knight was four, Jack Roughan died and his two older boys, who had been living with him, moved in with Barbara and Ken.

Ken Knight was a violent alcoholic who would rape Barbara up to ten times per day. Barbara, in turn, often told her daughters intimate details of her sex life and how much she hated sex and men. Later, when Katherine complained to her mother that one of her partners wanted her to take part in a sex act she did not want to perform, Barbara told her to "put up with it and stop complaining." Katherine claims she was frequently sexually assaulted by several members of her family (though not by her father), which continued until she was aged 11. Although there are doubts about the details, psychiatrists accept her claims and the events have been largely confirmed by other members of the family.

Barbara's great-grandmother was an Indigenous Australian from the Moree area who had married an Irishman. Barbara was proud of this fact and identified as Aboriginal. This was kept a family secret as there was considerable racism in the area at the time, and Barbara's descent was a source of tension for the children. Apart from her twin sister, the only person whom Katherine was close to was her uncle, Oscar Knight, a champion horseman. She was devastated when he committed suicide in 1969 and continues to maintain that his ghost visits her. The family moved back to Aberdeen the same year.

When she attended Muswellbrook high school, Katherine became a loner and is remembered by classmates as a bully who stood over smaller children. She assaulted at least one boy at school with a weapon and was once injured by a teacher, who was subsequently found to have acted in self-defense. By contrast, when not in a rage, Knight was a model student and often earned awards for her good behaviour. Upon leaving school at 15, without having learned to read or write, she gained employment as a cutter in a clothing factory. Twelve months later, she left to start what she referred to as her "dream job": cutting up offal at the local abattoir. There, she was quickly promoted to boning and was given her own set of butchers' knives. At home, the knives were hung over her bed so, as Knight said, that they "would always be handy if I needed them", a habit she continued—until her incarceration—everywhere she lived.

Marriage to David Kellett
Katherine Knight first met co-worker David Stanford Kellett in 1973. Kellett engaged in heavy drinking which stemmed from two traumatic incidents from his previous railway job in Coffs Harbour: first when his best friend was killed in front of him in a shunting accident, and later when he rescued injured occupants of a school bus in Kempsey which had been struck by a train, killing six children. He eventually lost the job due to deteriorating behavior and performance, but he soon got work at the nearby Aberdeen abattoir and became close friends with Knight's brother. 

Often, if Kellett got into a fight, Knight would step in and back him up with her fists. In Aberdeen, she was well known for physically threatening anyone who upset her. Knight married Kellett in 1974, at her request, with the couple arriving at the service on her motorcycle with a very intoxicated Kellett on the pillion. As soon as they arrived, Knight's mother Barbara gave Kellett some advice:"The old girl [Knight's mother] said to me to watch out. 'You better watch this one or she'll fucking kill you. Stir her up the wrong way or do the wrong thing and you're fucked, don't ever think of playing up on her [cheating on her], she'll fuckin' kill you.' And that was her mother talking! She told me she's got something loose. She's got a screw loose somewhere." On their wedding night, Knight tried to strangle Kellett; she later explained it was because he fell asleep after only having intercourse three times.

The marriage proved particularly violent and, on one occasion, a heavily pregnant Knight burned all of Kellett's clothing and shoes before hitting him across the back of the head with a frying pan, simply because he had arrived home late from a darts competition after reaching the finals. In fear for his life, Kellett fled before collapsing in a neighbour's house and was treated for a severely fractured skull. Police wanted to charge Knight, but she changed her behaviour to ingratiating Kellett and talked him into dropping the charges.

In May 1976, shortly after the birth of their first child, Melissa Ann, Kellett left Knight for another woman and moved to Queensland, apparently unable to cope with the abuse. The next day, Knight was seen pushing her new baby in a pram down the main street, violently throwing the pram from side to side. She was admitted to St Elmo's Hospital in Tamworth, where she was diagnosed with postnatal depression and spent several weeks recovering. After being released, Knight placed two-month-old Melissa on a railway line shortly before a train was due. She then stole an axe, went into town and threatened to kill several people. An unsheltered man known in the district as "Old Ted", who was foraging near the railway line, found and rescued Melissa, by all accounts only minutes before the train passed. Knight was arrested and again taken to St Elmo's Hospital, but apparently she recovered and signed herself out the following day.

A few days later, Knight slashed the face of a woman with one of her knives and demanded she drive her to Queensland to find Kellett. The woman escaped after they stopped at a service station; however, by the time police arrived, Knight had taken a young boy hostage and was threatening him with the knife. She was disarmed when police attacked her with brooms and was admitted to the Morisset Psychiatric Hospital. Knight told the nurses she had intended to kill the mechanic at the service station because he had repaired Kellett's car, which had allowed him to leave, and then kill both her husband and his mother when she arrived in Queensland. When police informed Kellett of the incident, he left his girlfriend and moved to Aberdeen with his mother to support Knight.

Knight was released on 9 August 1976 into the care of her mother-in-law and, along with Kellett, moved to Ipswich, a city west of Brisbane, where she obtained a job at the Dinmore meatworks. On 6 March 1980, they had another daughter, Natasha Maree. In 1984, Knight left Kellett and moved, first to her parents' house in Aberdeen, then to a rented house in nearby Muswellbrook. Although she returned to work at the abattoir, she injured her back the following year and went on a disability pension. Since she no longer needed to rent accommodation close to her work, the government gave her a Housing Commission residence in Aberdeen.

Other relationships

David Saunders
Knight met 38-year-old miner David Saunders in 1986. A few months later, he moved in with her and her daughters, although he kept his old apartment in Scone. Knight soon became jealous regarding what he did when she was not around and would often throw him out. He would move back to his apartment, where she would invariably follow and beg him to return. In May 1987, she cut the throat of his two-month-old dingo pup in front of him, for no more reason than as an example of what would happen if he ever had an affair, before going on to knock him unconscious with a frying pan. In June 1988, she gave birth to a third daughter, Sarah, which prompted Saunders to put a deposit on a house; Knight paid off the deposit when her workers' compensation came through in 1989. Knight decorated the house throughout with animal skins, skulls, horns, rusty animal traps, leather jackets, old boots, machetes, rakes and pitchforks. No space, including the ceilings, was left uncovered.

After an argument in which she hit Saunders in the face with an iron before stabbing him in the abdomen with a pair of scissors, he moved back to Scone, but when he later returned home to Aberdeen, he found she had cut up all his clothes. Saunders took a long service leave and went into hiding. Knight tried to find him, but no one admitted to knowing his whereabouts. Several months later, Saunders returned to see his daughter and found that Knight had gone to the police and unjustly told them she was afraid of him. They issued her an Apprehended Violence Order (AVO) against him.

John Chillingworth
In 1991, Knight became pregnant by 43-year-old former abattoir co-worker John Chillingworth and gave birth the following year to a boy they named Eric. Their relationship lasted three years before she left him for a man she had been having an affair with for some time, John Price.

John Price
John Charles Thomas Price (4 April 1955 – 1 March 2000) was the father of three children when Knight began an affair with him. Reputedly a "terrific bloke" liked by everyone who knew him, his own marriage had ended in 1988. While his two-year-old daughter had remained with his former wife, the two older children lived with him. Price was well aware of Knight's violent reputation as she moved into his house in 1995. His children liked her; he was making a lot of money working in the local mines, and, apart from violent arguments, at first "life was a bunch of roses."

In 1998, Knight and Price fought over his refusal to marry her. In retaliation, she videotaped items he had allegedly stolen from work and sent the tape to his boss. Although the items were out of date medical kits that he had scavenged from the company rubbish tip, Price was fired from the job he had held for seventeen years. That same day, he kicked her out and she returned to her own home while news of what she had done spread throughout the town. A few months later, Price restarted the relationship, although he now refused to allow her to move in with him. The fighting became even more frequent, and most of his friends would no longer have anything to do with him while they remained together.

Murder of John Price
In February 2000, a series of assaults on Price culminated with Knight stabbing him in the chest. Finally fed up, he kicked her out of his house. On 29 February, he stopped at the Scone Magistrate's Court on his way to work and took out a restraining order in an attempt to keep her away from both himself and his children. That afternoon, Price told his co-workers that if he did not come to work the next day, it would be because Knight had murdered him. Despite their pleas that Price should not return home, he stated that he was afraid Knight would kill his children if he did not. Price arrived home to find that Knight, although not there herself, had sent the children away for a sleep-over at a friend's house. He then spent the evening with his neighbours before returning home and going to bed at 11 pm. Earlier that day, Knight had bought new black lingerie and had videotaped all her children while making comments which have since been interpreted as a crude will. She later arrived at Price's house while he was sleeping and sat watching television for a few minutes before having a shower. She then woke Price and they had sex, after which he fell asleep.

At 6 am the next day, a neighbour became concerned that Price's car was still in the driveway, and when he did not arrive at work, his employer sent a worker to see what was wrong. Both the neighbour and the worker tried knocking on Price's bedroom window to wake him, but they alerted police after noticing blood on the front door. Breaking down the back door, police found Price's body, with Knight comatose from taking a large number of pills. She had stabbed Price with a butcher's knife while he was sleeping. According to the blood evidence, he awoke and tried to turn the light on before attempting to escape while Knight chased him through the house. He managed to open the front door and get outside, but he either stumbled back inside or was dragged back into the hallway, where he finally died after bleeding out. Later, Knight went into Aberdeen and withdrew $1,000 from Price's account at an ATM. Price's autopsy revealed that he had been stabbed at least 37 times, in both the front and back of his body, with many of the wounds extending into vital organs. 

Several hours after Price had died, Knight skinned him and hung the skin from a meat hook on the architrave of a door to the lounge room. She then decapitated Price and cooked parts of his body, serving up the meat with baked potato, pumpkin, beetroot, zucchine, cabbage, yellow squash and gravy in two settings at the dinner table, along with notes beside each plate, each having the name of one of Price's children on it. She was preparing to serve his body parts to his children. A third meal was thrown on the back lawn for unknown reasons, and it is speculated that Knight had attempted to eat it but could not. This has been put forward in support of her claim that she has no memory of the crime. Price's head was found in a pot with vegetables. Sometime later, Knight arranged the body with the left arm draped over an empty 1.25-litre soft drink bottle with the legs crossed. This was claimed in court to be an act of defilement demonstrating Knight's contempt for Price. Knight had left a handwritten note on top of a photograph of Price. Bloodstained and covered with small pieces of flesh, it read:

Time got you back Johathon for rapping [raping] my douter [daughter]. You to Beck [Price's daughter] for Ross – for Little John [his son]. Now play with little Johns dick John Price. (sic)

The accusations in the note were found to be groundless.

Trial
Knight's initial offer to plead guilty to manslaughter was rejected, and she was arraigned on 2 March 2001 on the charge of murdering Price, to which she entered a plea of not guilty. Her trial was initially fixed for 23 July 2001, but it was adjourned due to her counsel's illness and it was re-fixed for 15 October 2001.

When the trial commenced, Justice Barry O'Keefe offered the 60 jury prospects the option of being excused due to the nature of the photographic evidence, which five accepted. When the witness list was read out to the prospects, several more also dropped out after which the jury was empanelled. Knight's attorneys then spoke to the judge who adjourned to the following day. The next morning, Knight changed her plea to guilty, and the jury was dismissed. It was then made public that Justice O'Keefe had been advised of the plea change the day before. He had adjourned the trial and then ordered a psychiatric assessment overnight to determine if Knight understood the consequences of a guilty plea and was fit to make such a plea. Knight's legal team had planned to defend Knight by claiming amnesia and dissociation, a claim supported by most psychiatrists, although they did consider her sane. Two psychiatrists concluded that Knight suffered from borderline personality disorder.

No reason has ever been given for the guilty plea, and despite giving it, Knight still refused to accept responsibility for her actions. At the sentencing hearing, Knight's lawyers requested that she be excused to avoid hearing some of the facts, but the application was refused. When Timothy Lyons took the stand and described the skinning and decapitation, Knight became hysterical and had to be sedated.

On 8 November, Justice O'Keefe pointed out that the nature of the crime and Knight's lack of remorse required a severe penalty. He sentenced her to life imprisonment, refused to fix a non-parole period and ordered that her papers be marked "never to be released", the first time that this had been imposed on a woman in Australian history.

In June 2006, Knight appealed the life sentence, claiming that a penalty of life in prison without possibility of parole was too severe for the killing. Justices Peter McClellan, Michael Adams and Megan Latham dismissed the appeal in the New South Wales Court of Criminal Appeal in September, with Justice McClellan writing in his judgement, "This was an appalling crime, almost beyond contemplation in a civilised society."

References

External links 
 Casefile True Crime Podcast – Case 12: Katherine Knight – 26 March 2016

Living people
1955 births
Australian female murderers
Australian people convicted of murder
Australian people of Irish descent
Australian prisoners sentenced to life imprisonment
Female cannibals
Incidents of violence against men
People convicted of murder by New South Wales
People with borderline personality disorder
Prisoners sentenced to life imprisonment by New South Wales
20th-century Australian criminals
People from New England (New South Wales)